Grand Piano is a 1997 compilation by Narada.  It peaked at No. 10 on Billboard's Top New Age album charts in the same year.

From album liner: "In Narada's 15-year history, no single instrument has more clearly expressd our musical vision than the piano. Its vast scope and orchestral capabilities have allowed it to encompass a sweeping vista of music endowed with the beauty and spirit that characterizes our wide ranging repertoire.  Over the years — from David Lanz and Michael Jones to Bradley Joseph — Narada's music has found its most eloquent expression in the hands of highly gifted pianists."

Track listing
1.1   "Prelude: First Snow" – Michael Gettel – 3:01
1.2   "Summer's Child" – David Lanz – 6:10
1.3   "Portraits" – Spencer Brewer – 4:29
1.4   "Song For Eia (Edited)" – Michael Jones – 8:49
1.5   "A Gift Of The Sea" – Wayne Gratz – 6:52
1.6   "Gentle Earth And Sky" – Michael Gettel – 5:19
1.7   "Heartsounds" – David Lanz – 2:35
1.8   "For You" – Kostia – 5:10
1.9   "Cinderella" – Spencer Brewer – 3:01
1.10  "The Teacher" – Brian Mann – 4:01
1.11  "Farewell" – Kostia – 6:18
2.1   "Mexican Memories" – Michael Jones – 8:03
2.2   "Long Way From Home" – David Arkenstone – 3:49
2.3   "Courage Of The Wind" – David Lanz – 7:33
2.4   "Blue Ridge Part 2" – Wayne Gratz – 4:24
2.5   "Soliloquy" – Michael Whalen – 4:14
2.6   "The Last Roundup" – Richard Souther – 2:46
2.7   "Aspen Summer" – Michael Jones – 8:28
2.8   "Sacred Dance" – Ira Stein – 4:47
2.9   "Stray" – Bradley Joseph – 6:00
2.10   "Spirit" – Brian Mann – 5:27
2.11   "The Shape Of Her Face" – Michael Whalen – 4:27

Personnel
Executive Producer - Rich Denhart
Other (Designed By) - Connie Cage
Other (Mastered By) - Trevor Sadler
Photography - Dick Baker

References

External links
Listing at Narada.com
 
 Grand Piano at Discogs

1997 compilation albums
Instrumental compilation albums
Narada Productions compilation albums
New-age compilation albums